The Gran Hotel is a former historic hotel in Palma de Mallorca, in Spain. It is part of the historic centre of the city.
The hotel was designed by Lluís Domènech i Montaner and completed in 1903. Today the building has been converted into a cultural center, home to the Fundación la Caixa. It contains a permanent exhibition of paintings by Anglada Camarasa. The building is one of the most important examples of Modernisme on the island, with a facade lavishly decorated with sculptures and ceramics.

References

External links

Buildings and structures in Palma de Mallorca
Hotels in Mallorca
Art museums and galleries in Spain
Hotels established in 1903
Museums in the Balearic Islands
1903 establishments in Spain
Modernisme architecture
Tourist attractions in Mallorca
Art Nouveau hotels
Hotel buildings completed in 1903
Bien de Interés Cultural landmarks in the Balearic Islands
La Caixa